Pete Swanson may refer to:
 Pete Swanson (American football), American football player
 Pete Swanson (musician), member of Yellow Swans

See also
 Peter Swanson, American author
 Peter Swanson (rugby), South African rugby union and rugby league player